Med Systems Software was a company that produced video games for home computers in the early 1980s. In 1983, the company name was changed to Screenplay.

History
Med Systems Software was headquartered in Chapel Hill, North Carolina.

Games
Labyrinth (1980)
Deathmaze 5000 (1980, by Frank Corr)
Asylum (1981)
The Institute (1981)
Laser Defense (1981, by Simon Smith)
The Human Adventure (1981, by William F. Denman, Jr.)
Microworld (1981, by Arti Haroutunian)
Asylum II (1982)
Dunzhin (1982)
Phantom Slayer (1982)
Danger Ranger (1983)
Monkey Kong (1983)

References

Defunct video game companies of the United States